Murat Önür (born February 15, 1981 in Afşin, Turkey) is a Turkish retired football player.

External links
 Profile at TFF.org 
 Profile at futbolig.com.tr 

1981 births
Living people
Turkish footballers
Eskişehirspor footballers
Boluspor footballers
Denizlispor footballers
Diyarbakırspor footballers
Kartalspor footballers
Turkey youth international footballers
Association football defenders
People from Afşin